Carlos and Elisabeth is a 1924 German silent drama film directed by Richard Oswald and starring Conrad Veidt, Eugen Klöpfer, and Aud Egede-Nissen. It is based on the play Don Carlos by Friedrich Schiller. Oswald modelled the film's visuals on a staging of the play by Max Reinhardt at the Deutsches Theater.

The film's sets were designed by the art director Oscar Friedrich Werndorff.

Cast

References

Bibliography

External links

1924 films
Films of the Weimar Republic
1920s historical drama films
German historical drama films
German epic films
German silent feature films
German black-and-white films
Films directed by Richard Oswald
Films set in Spain
Films set in the 16th century
German films based on plays
Films based on works by Friedrich Schiller
Cultural depictions of Fernando Álvarez de Toledo, 3rd Duke of Alba
1924 drama films
Silent drama films
Silent adventure films
1920s German films